The Jiangwan Mosque is a mosque in Yangpu District, Shanghai, China.

History
The mosque was established in 1928.

Transportation
The mosque is accessible within walking distance south east of Sanmen Road Station of Shanghai Metro.

See also
 Islam in China
 List of mosques in China

References

1928 establishments in China
Mosques completed in 1928
Mosques in Shanghai